Highway 369 is a highway in the Canadian province of Saskatchewan. It runs from Highway 10 near the Manitoba border to Highway 5 and Highway 357 near Togo.

The route was originally part of Provincial Highway 5, but became Highway 369 in the 1960s when Highway 5 was realigned to the Manitoba border east to Togo.

References

369